Hitobia is a genus of Asian ground spiders that was first described by T. Kamura in 1992.

Species
 it contains twenty-one species:
Hitobia asiatica (Bösenberg & Strand, 1906) – Japan
Hitobia cancellata Yin, Peng, Gong & Kim, 1996 – China
Hitobia chayuensis Song, Zhu & Zhang, 2004 – China
Hitobia hirtella Wang & Peng, 2014 – China
Hitobia lamhetaghatensis (Gajbe & Gajbe, 1999) – India
Hitobia makotoi Kamura, 2011 – China, Japan
Hitobia meghalayensis (Tikader & Gajbe, 1976) – India
Hitobia menglong Song, Zhu & Zhang, 2004 – China
Hitobia monsta Yin, Peng, Gong & Kim, 1996 – China
Hitobia poonaensis (Tikader & Gajbe, 1976) – India
Hitobia procula Sankaran & Sebastian, 2018 – India
Hitobia shaohai Yin & Bao, 2012 – China
Hitobia shimen Yin & Bao, 2012 – China
Hitobia singhi (Tikader & Gajbe, 1976) – India
Hitobia taiwanica Zhang, Zhu & Tso, 2009 – Taiwan
Hitobia tengchong Wang & Peng, 2014 – China
Hitobia tenuicincta (Simon, 1909) – Vietnam
Hitobia unifascigera (Bösenberg & Strand, 1906) (type) – China, Korea, Japan
Hitobia yaginumai Deeleman-Reinhold, 2001 – Thailand
Hitobia yasunosukei Kamura, 1992 – China, Okinawa
Hitobia yunnan Song, Zhu & Zhang, 2004 – China

References

Araneomorphae genera
Gnaphosidae
Spiders of Asia